The 2012–13 The Citadel Bulldogs basketball team represented The Citadel, The Military College of South Carolina in the 2012–13 NCAA Division I men's basketball season. The Bulldogs were led by third year head coach Chuck Driesell and played their home games at McAlister Field House. They were a member of the South Division of the Southern Conference. They finished the season 8–22, 5–13 in SoCon play to finish in fifth place in the South Division. They lost in the first round of the SoCon tournament to Western Carolina.

Preseason
The Citadel signed two recruits in the early signing period. The Bulldogs also landed graduate enrollee Stephen Elmore, son of Maryland great Len Elmore.  Elmore will have one year of eligibility after graduating in three years from Princeton University, where he played baseball.  The Bulldogs also lost three players to transfer, DeVontae Wright (South Carolina–Aiken), Jordan Robertson (Davidson County Community College), and Bo Holston (Anderson University).

Recruiting

Roster

Schedule

|-
! colspan=8 style=""|Regular Season

|-
! colspan=8 style=""|

References

The Citadel Bulldogs basketball seasons
Citadel
Citadel
Citadel